Thar Es-Souk is a municipality in the Taounate Province of the Taza-Al Hoceima-Taounate administrative region of Morocco. At the time of the 2004 census, the commune had a total population of 3792 people living in 733 households.

Notable people  

Rhadi Ben Abdesselam, Olympic silver medalist runner
Yasmine Lafitte, pornographic actress

References

Populated places in Taounate Province
Rural communes of Fès-Meknès